The hairy-belted miner bee (Andrena hirticincta) is a species of miner bee in the family Andrenidae. Another common name for this species is the hairy-banded andrena. It is found in North America.

References

Further reading

External links

 

hirticincta
Articles created by Qbugbot
Insects described in 1888